D534 connects A1 motorway Gospić interchange to Gospić and Lički Osik via D25 and D50 state roads, which are concurrent between Gospić and Lički Osik, where the starting terminus of the D534 road is located.

The road, as well as all other state roads in Croatia, is managed and maintained by Hrvatske ceste, a state-owned company.

Traffic volume 

The D534 state road traffic volume is not reported by Hrvatske ceste. However, they regularly count and report traffic volume on the A1 motorway Gospić interchange, which connects to the D534 road only, thus permitting the D534 road traffic volume to be accurately calculated. The report includes no information on ASDT volumes.

Road junctions and populated areas

Sources

State roads in Croatia
Lika-Senj County